Ctenis is a genus of fossil foliage attributable to the Cycadales, being one of the most common genera of cycad fossil leaves in the Mesozoic.

Taxonomy
The genus was first erected by Lindley and Hutton in "The fossil flora of Great Britain", based on material of Ctenis falcata from the Jurassic of Yorkshire. This species was later synonimized with Cycadites sulcicaulis, leading to the new combination Ctenis sulcicaulis. Later, Seward, Florin, and Harris added details of the cuticle to the diagnosis of the genus.

Description
The leaves of Ctenis are once pinnate, and the pinnae have multiple parallel veins that often anastomosize (i.e. fuse together). The cuticle of Ctenis has stomata with guard cells arranged in a random fashion, and the stomatal apparatus has often a cuticular ring surrounding the stomatal pit. The cuticular surface is usually striate.

Distribution
Though Ctenis-like leaves are known from the Late Permian Umm Irna Formation of Jordan, Ctenis becomes more common from the Late Triassic onwards. In the Jurassic, many Ctenis species are retrieved from Europe, North America, and Asia. In the Early Cretaceous, Ctenis is still found in Europe (i.e. in the Wealden) and Asia, but from the Late Cretaceous it seems to retreat to more Northern Latitudes in the Siberian region and North America and Southern latitudes in Australia. The last members of this genus are found in the Eocene of North America.

Paleoecology
Little is known about the ecology of the Ctenis-producing plants. However, in the Big Cedar Ridge locality in Wyoming (Campanian), Ctenis is found in the fern wetland together with ferns from the Dipteridaceae, Gleicheniaceae, and Matoniaceae. This suggests that at least some members of the genus inhabited wet environments with peaty soils.

References

Cycads
Prehistoric gymnosperm genera
Mesozoic plants
Cenozoic plants
Clarno Formation